Streptanthella is a monotypic genus of flowering plants in the family Brassicaceae containing the single species Streptanthella longirostris, which is known by the common name longbeak streptanthella, or simply streptanthella. It is native to western North America, where it occurs throughout the western United States and the northwestern states of Mexico. It grows in many types of habitat, including deserts, sagebrush, foothill woodlands, sandy flats, chaparral, and scrubby canyons. It is an annual herb producing a slender, erect, multibranched stem up to half a meter tall. The lower leaves are lance-shaped with a toothed or smooth edge and leaves higher on the plant are narrower, linear in shape, and less often toothed. The top of the stem is occupied by a long inflorescence which is an open raceme of many flowers. The top of the inflorescence bears the newest buds which are often purple in color. More mature flowers stud the stem at intervals below, each on a short pedicel. Flowers measure under a centimeter long. Each flower is enclosed in four thick sepals. At the tip are the spoon-shaped petals which are white to yellow with purple veining. The fruit is a long, dangling silique up to 7 centimeters in length containing flat, winged seeds.

References

External links
Jepson Manual Treatment
Flora of North America
Washington Burke Museum
Photo gallery

Brassicaceae
Flora of the United States
Flora of Mexico
Monotypic Brassicaceae genera